Nick Hector is a British Canadian film producer and editor, and professor of film production at the University of Windsor.

Career 
Hector collaborated with Canadian filmmaker Allan King and exclusively cut his films during the last decade of King's career. He won a Gemini for editing King's TIFF "Top Ten Canadian Film" and Gemini Award-winning Dying at Grace, which the Toronto International Film Festival described as “one of the best ever made in this country”.  In 1996 he won the Hot Docs "Best Editing" award for Yvan Patry’s Hand of God.  He received a Gemini in 1998 for his work on Yvan Patry’s Hot Docs Best of Festival and Chalmers Award winner Chronique d’un genocide announce.  In 2009, he won a Gemini for editing Sturla Gunnarsson’s Air India 182, making him the only editor to be awarded three Gemini Awards for documentary.

Hector's credits include Tim Southam’s Genie-nominated Drowning in Dreams; John Haslett Cuff’s Gemini-winning Crimes of the Heart; Min Sook Lee’s Hogtown and Allan King’s Memory for Max, Claire, Ida and Company. He edited Sturla Gunnarsson's documentary about David Suzuki, Force of Nature: The David Suzuki Movie, which won the People’s Choice Documentary Award at the 2010 Toronto International Film Festival, the Canadian Cinema Editors Award for Best Documentary Editing and also the Directors Guild of Canada's Allan King Award for Excellence in Documentary Filmmaking.  In 2014 Hector cut Gunnarsson's TIFF Canadian Top Ten Audience Award winner Monsoon. Most recently, Hector was awarded a Canadian Screen Award for editing the Canadian instalment of Ridley Scott's Life in a Day franchise Canada in a Day.

In addition, Hector served as a co-producer for the documentaries The Perfect Story, Prey, Sharkwater Extinction, Wiebo's War, Thay - The Teacher, War Surgeon, Actuality, and the award-winning El Chogui.  He served as series producer for Birth Stories and Love is Not Enough and co-director of the CSA Award-winning series War Story.  Hector was nominated for a 2012 Genie Award - Best Feature Documentary for Wiebo's War.

In 2018, Hector completed the movie Sharkwater Extinction after the death of Rob Stewart.

Hector is a member of the Directors Guild of Canada, Canadian Cinema Editors, and British Film Editors and an international partner of American Cinema Editors.

Filmography
{| class="wikitable"
|-
! Year
! Title
! Role
! class="unsortable" | Notes
|-
| 1989
| The Forbidden Land
| Editor, Sound Editor
| Nyon International Documentary Film Festival Jury Prize  American Film & Video Festival Blue Ribbon 
|-
| 1989
| Electronic Jam
| Editor, Sound Editor
| Finalist - Gemini Award for Best Documentary Sound
|-
| 1991
| Nuit et silence
| Editor, Sound Editor
| Finaliste - Prix Gémeaux meilleur montage documentaire  Canadian Association of Journalists Award for Best Television Reportage  Canadian Association of Journalists Award for Best Reportage in any Media
|-
| 1992
| Winds of Memory
| Editor
| Festival of the Americas Special Jury Prize, Best Human Rights Film  Premio Coral, La Habana Festival del Nuevo Cine Latinoamericano  Premio Festival de las Americas, Lima  Festival Cine-Iberoamerican (Huelva, Spain)   Best Documentary Festival Tam Tam Video, Pisa
|-
| 1996
| Hand of God
| Editor
| HotDocs Award for Best Documentary Editing
|-
| 1997
| Drowning in Dreams
| Editor
| Finalist - Genie Award for Best Documentary
|-
| 1997
| Nica-Libre
| Editor
| Primer Premio Documental Festival Derhumalc Buenos Aires
|-
| 1997
| Chronique d'un genocide
| Editor
| Gemini Award for Best Documentary Editing  Hot Docs Award for Best of Festival  Hot Docs Award for Best Theatrical Film   Chalmers Arts Awards for Best Documentary Film  Cinémathèque québécoise Award for Best Quebeccois Film  Finaliste - Prix Gémeaux meilleur montage documentaire
|-
| 1999
| The Dragon's Egg
| Editor
| Finalist - Gemini Award for Best Documentary  Finalist - Gemini Award for Best Documentary Editing
|-
| 2002
| El Chogui
| Producer, Editor
| Contra el Silencio todas las Voces (Mexico) Award for Best Documentary  La Festival Medias Nord-Sud (Switzerland) Award for Best Independent Film  Los Angeles Latino International Film Festival Award for Best Documentary  San Francisco Latino Film Festival Award for Best in Festival  La Cinemafe Film Festival (New York) Special Jury Prize
|-
| 2003
| Inside Information
| Editor
| Finalist - Gemini Award for Best Documentary Editing
|-
| 2003
| Dying at Grace
| Editor
| Gemini Award for Best Documentary  Gemini Award for Best Documentary Directing  Gemini Award for Best Documentary Editing  Directors Guild of Canada Award for Best Documentary Team  Cinematheque Ontario Award for Top Ten Canadian Film  Best Picture - World Cinema, Phoenix 
|-
| 2004
| Hogtown
| Editor
| HotDocs Award for Best Canadian Documentary
|-
| 2005
| Memory for Max, Claire, Ida and Company
| Editor
| Finalist - Gemini Award for Best Documentary  Finalist - Gemini Award for Best Documentary Editing  Finalist - Gemini Award for Best Documentary Sound  Finalist - Directors Guild of Canada Award for Best Documentary Team 
|-
| 2006
| EMPz 4 Life
| Editor
| Finalist - Directors Guild of Canada Award for Best Documentary Team
|-
| 2009
| Air India 182 (film)
| Editor
| Directors Guild of Canada's Allan King Award  Gemini Award for Best Documentary Editing   Finalist - Gemini Award for Best Documentary
|-
| 2010
| Experimental Eskimos
| Editor
| Directors Guild of Canada's Allan King Award  Yorkton Film Festival's NFB Kathleen Shannon Award  Winnipeg Aboriginal Film Festival Award for Best Documentary
|-
| 2011
| Force of Nature: The David Suzuki Movie
| Editor
| Canadian Cinema Editors Award for Best Documentary Editing  Directors Guild of Canada's Allan King Award   Toronto International Film Festival People's Choice Documentary Award  Canadian Environmental Media Award of Excellence  Vancouver International Film Festival Award for Best Environmental Film  Byron Bay Film Festival Award for Best Film   Cinéfest Award for Best Documentary
|-
| 2012
| Wiebo's War
| Producer, Editor
| Finalist - Genie Award for Best Feature Documentary  Finalist - Directors Guild of Canada's Allan King  Finalist - Canadian Cinema Editors Award for Best Documentary Editing  Finalist - Sheffield Green Award   Honourable Mention - Hot Docs Best Feature Documentary   Honourable Mention - RIDM Award for Best Canadian Feature  
|-
| 2013
| Echoes
| Editor
| Canadian Cinema Editors Award for Best Documentary Editing
|-
| 2014
| War Story
| Co-director, Editor
| Canadian Screen Award for Best Documentary Series  Yorkton Film Festival Golden Sheaf Award for Best Documentary Series  Houston International Independent Film Festival WorldFest Award   Finalist - Canadian Screen Award for Best Documentary Editing
|-
| 2015
| Monsoon (2014 film)
| Editor
| Toronto International Film Festival Top Ten Canadian Film  TIFF Top Ten Festival Audience Award   Polly Krakora Award for Artistry in Film   Finalist - Canadian Cinema Editors Award for Best Documentary Editing   Finalist - Directors Guild of Canada's Allan King Award
|-
| 2016
| This Changes Everything
| Editor
| Cinema Politica Audience Choice Award  Finalist - Directors Guild of Canada Award for Best Documentary Editing 
|-
| 2016
| War Story: Afghanistan
| Co-director, Editor
| | Canadian Screen Award for Best History Documentary 
|-
| 2017
| Canada in a Day
| Editor
| Canadian Screen Award for Best Documentary Editing
|-
| 2017
| Unfractured
| Editor
| Planet in Focus Award for Best Canadian Feature  Earthx Film (Texas) Award for Best Feature  Finalist - Directors Guild of Canada Award for Best Documentary Editing 
|- 
| 2017
| How to Prepare for Prison
| Editor
| Finalist - Canadian Cinema Editors Award for Best Documentary Editing
|-
| 2018
| Sharkwater Extinction
| Producer, Editor
| Canadian Cinema Editors Award - Best Documentary Editing  Best Environmental Film - Byron Bay Film Festival  Best Documentary - Fort Lauderdale Film Festival  Courageous Filmmaking Award - Napa Valley Film Festival  Best Educational Film - Green Film Festival (China)  Finalist - Best Documentary - New York Festivals  Finalist - Directors Guild of Canada Award for Best Documentary Editing 
|-
| 2019
| Prey
| Co-producer, Editor
| HotDocs Special Jury Prize - Canadian Feature  HotDocs Audience Award - Best Canadian Feature  Windsor International Film Festival - Audience Award  Canadian Cinema Editors Award - Best Feature Documentary Editing Forest City Film Festival - Best Feature Documentary   Forest City Film Festival - Audience Award  Finalist - Canadian Screen Award - Best Feature Documentary  Finalist - Canadian Screen Award - Best Feature Documentary Editing  Finalist - Directors Guild of Canada Award for Best Documentary  Finalist - Directors Guild of Canada Award for Best Documentary Editing  Finalist - Fargo Film Festival - Best Feature Documentary 
|-
| 2020
| Fight to the Finish
| Co-producer, Editor
| Finalist - Canadian Screen Award - Best History Documentary  
|-
| 2021
| Dispatches from a Field Hospital
| Story Editor
| Finalist - Canadian Screen Award - Social Political Documentary  
|-
| 2022
| The Perfect Story
| Co-producer, Editor
| Best Canadian Documentary - Calgary International Film Festival  Finalist - Directors Guild of Canada Award for Best Documentary Editing   Finalist - Canadian Screen Award - Best Documentary Program

References

External links
 

Canadian film editors
British film editors
Best Editing Genie and Canadian Screen Award winners
Academic staff of University of Windsor
Canadian television producers
Canadian documentary film producers
Alumni of Bournemouth University
Living people
Year of birth missing (living people)